Alice Cliff Scatcherd (1842–1906) was an early British suffragist who in 1889 founded the Women's Franchise League, with Harriet McIlquham, Ursula Bright, Emmeline Pankhurst, Richard Pankhurst and Elizabeth Clarke Wolstenholme Elmy.

Scatcherd was born in Wortley and was a lifelong campaigner for women's rights who lived much of her life in Morley, West Yorkshire including in Morley Hall.

Suffragist career
She was secretary for the Leeds branch of the National Society for Women's Suffrage (NSWS).

Scatcherd was active in speaking out at events in the 1870s as typified by an example on 24 March 1877, when she appeared alongside Lydia Becker and other early suffragettes to discuss women's access to the vote in Macclesfield. The chairman, J. W. White, addressed the meeting saying that "it appeared somewhat strange that whereas the British Parliament had been engaged from time to time for many years back in conferring rights and removing disabilities, there should still exist any large and intelligent section of society outside the electoral community. They had not yet found any good reason given for excluding from parliamentary suffrage women who had already voted in municipal and school board elections; therefore they intended to reiterate their demands until they were conceded". Scatcherd was supported by Henry Birchenough in seconding the first resolution which was moved by Joshua Oldfield Nicholson.

The Alice Cliff Scatcherd scrapbook (SCAT B SCA) comprises letters, photographs and letterpress relating to the national suffrage campaign, politics, education and Morley civic life and is held at Leeds Central Library.

A blue plaque to commemorate Scatcherd was unveiled on 2 August 2022 her former home, Park House, Queen Street, Morley (now a funeral directors').   It carries the words "This champion of women's education, trade unionism and suffrage, who established the Morley District Nurses Association, lived here. She was a founder member of the Women's Franchise League, established in 1889. As a philanthropist, she donated Scatcherd Park to the people of Morley. 1842 - 1906".

Family
Alice Cliff was born in 1842 to Joseph and Alice Cliff. According to the 1851 census the family lived in Wortley, Leeds and Scatcherd had three brothers and three sisters. Alice Cliff married Oliver Scatcherd on 3 October 1871 in Morley. He was a solicitor and lived in Morley House at the time of his marriage. Scatcherd was critical of the existing nature of marriage and refused to attend wedding services in established churches where women took a vow of obedience to men. She is said to have shocked late 19th Century conservative society by travelling Europe with her husband without a wedding ring.

Scatcherd is buried in the Scatcherd Mausoleum in St Mary in the Wood churchyard, Morley.

References

External links
 http://www.mmtrust.org.uk/mausolea/view/220/Scatcherd_Mausoleum Scatcherd Mausoleum
 http://discovery.nationalarchives.gov.uk/details/r/e2d61b0c-a8ea-418a-ab9c-55f3033b2055 Scatcherd Collection, Morley Library

English suffragists
People from Morley, West Yorkshire
1842 births
1906 deaths